Peleduy is an urban locality (an urban-type settlement) in Lensky District of the Sakha Republic, Russia. As of the 2010 Census, its population was 5,243.

Geography

History
Urban-type settlement status was granted to Peleduy in 1938.

Administrative and municipal status
Within the framework of administrative divisions, the urban-type settlement of Peleduy, together with one rural locality (the selo of Krestovsky lesouchastok), is incorporated within Lensky District as the Settlement of Peleduy. As a municipal division, the Settlement of Peleduy is incorporated within Lensky Municipal District as Peleduy Urban Settlement.

References

Notes

Sources
Official website of the Sakha Republic. Registry of the Administrative-Territorial Divisions of the Sakha Republic. Lensky District. 

Urban-type settlements in the Sakha Republic
Populated places on the Lena River